Sree Ayyappa College, Eramallikkara is Government aided college of Higher Education located at Eramallikkara, Chengannur, affiliated to University of Kerala. The college is owned and managed by Travancore Devaswom Board. Started functioning in 1995 under colleges included under Section 2(f)/12(B) of UGC Act 1956, as the fulfilment of a long cherished dream of the rustic populace of the serene and beautiful hamlet of Eramallikkara, situated at the confluence of the twin-rivers, holy Pamba River and Manimala.

Location
Sree Ayyappa college is located at Eramallikara, Thiruvanvandoor, which is about 4 km from NH 183. The Chengannur Railway station is the nearest railway station to the college.

Departments
 Commerce with Computer application
 Computer Science
 Electronics
 Industrial Microbiology and Bio chemistry
 Mathematics
 Oriental languages
 Physical Education

Courses Offered
Two year post graduation course in
M.Sc Computer Science
Under Graduation courses in
B.Sc Computer Science
B.Sc Electronics
B.Sc Mathematics
B.Sc Biochemistry & Industrial Microbiology
B.com Commerce with Computer Application
B.A English and Media Studies

Accreditation
It is a NAAC accredited college.

About
Admission to all classes is governed by the rules laid down by the Govt.of Kerala and the University of Kerala from time to time

References

External links
 Official Website

Universities and colleges in Kerala
University of Kerala